Sätra is a suburb in the  district in Söderort in Stockholm, Sweden.

Location
The district is bounded on the north by Lake Mälaren and on the south by  Södertalje Road, a section of European route E4 and  European route E20. Sätra borders the districts of Bredäng and Skärholmen, as well as  Segeltorp  in Huddinge municipality and Kungshatt in Ekerö municipality.

History
The City of Stockholm bought the land in 1934 A.D.  A new general plan for Sätra was drawn up the day after. Construction began in 1964 and four years later the entire district was almost completed.  Together Sätra metro station and Sätra Centrum  form the hub. Just South of the Sätra industrial buildings.

Sätra metro station is on the Red Line (Röda Linjen) of Stockholm metro. The station was opened in 1965 as the southwest terminus of the extension from Örnsberg. In 1967, the line was extended to Skärholmen.

References

Districts of Stockholm